Farébersviller (Lorraine Franconian: Fareewerschwiller/Ewerschwiller) is a commune in the Moselle department in Grand Est in north-eastern France.

It is located only 3 km from the German border.

Location
Farébersviller lies at the heart of the coalfield between 3 major cities that are Forbach, Sarreguemines and Saint-Avold.

The municipality consists of 2 very different entities that are the village, the original place to the south and the city, created from 1954 by the Houillères du Bassin de Lorraine (HBL) to accommodate a large number of miners working in the Valley the Rosselle nearby.

Administration
Since 1989 the mayor of the municipality is Laurent Kleinhentz.

Demography

Sites and monuments

Religious Buildings

 The church of Saint-Jean-Baptiste
 The church of Sainte-Thérèse
 The chapel of Saint-Antoine
 El-Hijra Mosque with minaret

Cultural structures
 Good Fountain Square and the local art house in the village
 Social Center St-Exupery
 Center François Rabelais

Sports equipment
 Complex Marcel Cerdan
 COSEC
 Small Gym
 Tennis Stadium
 Soccer Stadium
 Archery

Personalities associated with the municipality
 Gennaro Bracigliano (1980- ), Goalkeeper at l'ASNL

Twinnings
  Mercato San Severino - Italy

See also
 Communes of the Moselle department

Notes and references

External links

 Site de la mairie

Communes of Moselle (department)